Omar Gerardo Gómez Galicia (born January 6, 1980, in Monterrey, Nuevo León) is a Mexican football manager and former player.

External links
 

Living people
1980 births
Mexico youth international footballers
Mexican football managers
C.F. Monterrey players
Dorados de Sinaloa footballers
Tigres UANL footballers
Atlante F.C. footballers
Guerreros de Hermosillo F.C. footballers
Liga MX players
Ascenso MX players
Footballers from Nuevo León
Sportspeople from Monterrey
Association football forwards
Mexican footballers